The Scottish Children's Reporter Administration (SCRA) is an executive non-departmental public body of the Scottish Government, with responsibility for protecting children at risk. SCRA was formed under the Local Government (Scotland) Act 1994 and became fully operational on 1 April 1996, taking over responsibility for the existing system of Children's Reporters (see Children's Hearing).

SCRA's aim is to "provide a safety net for vulnerable children and deliver tailored solutions which meet the needs of the individuals involved, while helping to build stronger families and safer communities".

Organisation
Although SCRA operates within a legislative remit, and at arm's length from government, it receives  oversight and direction from its board. As a non-departmental public body, SCRA's board, although acting independently, is accountable to Scottish Ministers. Management oversight is achieved by a series of Committees. Complaints are usually dealt with by SCRA, but the public can also complain to the Scottish Public Services Ombudsman (SPSO).This will only happen after the SCRA complaints process has been exhausted.

Referral mechanism

Referrals are made to SCRA about children who may be in need of legal intervention to help them address their needs and/or behaviour. The referral may be made on offence grounds and/or care and protection grounds. Most referrals are received from the police, social work departments or schools. However, parents, family members, carers or any concerned member of the public can also contact the Children's Reporter. These grounds are contained within statute namely, Section 67(2) of the Children's Hearings (Scotland) Act, 2011.

Each case is assigned to a Children's Reporter employed by SCRA. The Reporter investigates the case and decides whether or not compulsory measures of supervision may be required. If, in the Reporter's opinion, such measures are required, a Hearing will be arranged. The Reporter may take other steps short of arranging a Hearing, for example arrange for some form of restorative justice.

Referral statistics
53,883 children were referred in 2005/6 and 87% of referrals came from the police. This represents a doubling in the number of referrals since the SCRA took responsibility for Children's Reporters.

In 2005, 16,470 children (33%) were referred to the Reporter for an offence and 33,379 children (67%) were referred on non-offence grounds (i.e. concern for their safety or welfare).

In 2015–16, there were 15,329 referrals received which represented 1.7% of all children and young people in Scotland; 2,761 of the referrals were on offence grounds.

Role in the Children's Hearings System

SCRA's role within the Children's Hearings System is to provide suitable accommodation for Hearings, provide information to the hearing panel and to enable the children and families to participate in Hearings.

See also
 Social care in Scotland

References

External links

Children's Hearings

Children's Reporter
Children
Scots family law
Scottish society
Social work organizations
Government agencies established in 1996
Children's rights in Scotland
1996 establishments in Scotland
Organisations based in Stirling (council area)
Child welfare in Scotland